The 3 arrondissements of the Charente department are:
 Arrondissement of Angoulême, (prefecture of the Charente department: Angoulême) with 115 communes. The population of the arrondissement was 181,456 in 2016.  
 Arrondissement of Cognac, (subprefecture: Cognac) with 110 communes. The population of the arrondissement was 99,987 in 2016.
 Arrondissement of Confolens, (subprefecture: Confolens) with 140 communes. The population of the arrondissement was 71,845 in 2016.

History

In 1800 the arrondissements of Angoulême, Barbezieux, Cognac, Confolens and Ruffec were established. The arrondissements of Barbezieux and Ruffec were disbanded in 1926. On 1 January 2008 the four cantons of Aigre, Mansle, Ruffec and Villefagnan that previously belonged to the arrondissement of Angoulême were added to the arrondissement of Confolens, and the canton of Rouillac to the arrondissement of Cognac.

The borders of the arrondissements of Charente were modified in January 2017:
 14 communes from the arrondissement of Angoulême to the arrondissement of Cognac
 15 communes from the arrondissement of Angoulême to the arrondissement of Confolens
 two communes from the arrondissement of Cognac to the arrondissement of Angoulême

References

Charente